The 1951 Divizia A was the thirty-fourth season of Divizia A, the top-level football league of Romania.

Teams

League table

Results

Top goalscorers

Champion squad

See also 

 1951 Divizia B

References

Liga I seasons
Romania
Romania
1
1